Jansson's temptation (Swedish: Janssons frestelse) is a traditional Swedish casserole made of potatoes, onions, pickled sprats, bread crumbs and cream. It is commonly included in a Swedish  julbord (Christmas smörgåsbord), and the Easter påskbuffé, which is lighter than a traditional julbord. The dish is also common in Finland where it is known as janssoninkiusaus.

Preparation

The potatoes are cut into thin strips and layered in a roasting tin, alternating with the sprats and chopped onions in between. Salt and pepper is put over each layer, then cream is added so that it almost fills the tin.

The recipe is often mistranslated into English, with anchovies being substituted for sprats. This is because sprats (Sprattus sprattus) pickled in sugar, salt and spices have been known in Sweden as ansjovis since the middle of the 19th century, while true anchovies (Engraulis encrasicolus) are sold in Sweden as sardeller (sardelles). Also, small herrings (Clupea harengus) may be used instead of sprats.

Name and origin
It has often been associated with the opera singer Per Adolf "Pelle" Janzon (1844–1889), remembered as a gourmand. However, another claim for the origin of the name has been made by Gunnar Stigmark (1910–2001) in an article, "Så var det med Janssons frestelse", which appeared in the periodical Gastronomisk kalender. According to Stigmark, the name was borrowed from the film Janssons frestelse (1928) featuring the film actor and director Edvin Adolphson; as a name for this dish, it was coined by Stigmark's mother and her hired female chef for the particular occasion of a society dinner, whence it spread to other households and eventually into cookbooks.

See also
 List of casserole dishes

References

External links
Recipe at ica.se

Casserole dishes
Potato dishes
Swedish cuisine
Finnish cuisine
Vegetable dishes
Christmas food
Fish dishes
Christmas in Sweden
Easter food